The Smoke Eaters is a 1926 American silent action film directed by Charles J. Hunt and Charles Hutchison and starring Cullen Landis, Wanda Hawley and Edward Cecil.

Cast
 Cullen Landis as Ed 
 Wanda Hawley as Jacqueline 
 Edward Cecil as Edmund Kane 
 Aryel Darma as His Wife 
 Broderick O'Farrell as Roscoe Wingate 
 Mae Prestell as Marie Wingate 
 Harold Austin as Kenneth Wingate 
 Baby Moncur as Junior Wingate

References

Bibliography
 Munden, Kenneth White. The American Film Institute Catalog of Motion Pictures Produced in the United States, Part 1. University of California Press, 1997.

External links

1926 films
1920s action films
American action films
Films directed by Charles J. Hunt
Films directed by Charles Hutchison
American silent feature films
Rayart Pictures films
American black-and-white films
1920s English-language films
1920s American films